The 15th Virginia Regiment was authorized on September 16, 1776, as a part of the Virginia Line for service with the Continental Army under the command of David Mason. All or part of the regiment saw action at Brandywine, Germantown, Monmouth, and the Siege of Charleston where all of the Regiment was captured in the last. The regiment was disbanded on January 1, 1781.

References

External links
Bibliography of the Continental Army in Virginia compiled by the United States Army Center of Military History

15th Virginia Regiment